Rodney William Woodward (September 22, 1944 – September 27, 2016) was a defensive back in the Canadian Football League for twelve years. Woodward won the Grey Cup as a member of the Ottawa Rough Riders in 1973 and 1976. In 2009 he was sentenced to jail for "stealing $185,000 from two elderly clients to pay gambling debts" but his wife believes that this may have been a consequence of injuries he suffered during his football career.  He died in 2016 after a fall, having experienced the effects of dementia in his later years.

References

External links
CFLapedia bio
Just Sports Stats

1944 births
2016 deaths
Calgary Stampeders players
Canadian football defensive backs
Hamilton Tiger-Cats players
Idaho Vandals football players
Montreal Alouettes players
Ottawa Rough Riders players
Canadian football people from Vancouver
Simon Fraser Clan football coaches
Players of Canadian football from British Columbia